Ahmed El-Attar (born April 13, 1967) is an Egyptian handball player. He competed for Egypt's national team at the 1992 and 1996 Summer Olympics.

References 

1967 births
Living people
Egyptian male handball players
Olympic handball players of Egypt
Handball players at the 1992 Summer Olympics
Handball players at the 1996 Summer Olympics